Colonel William Davies was an officer in the Continental Army who served in the Virginia Line for the duration of the American Revolutionary War.

William Davies' service in the American Revolution began when he was commissioned a captain in the 1st Virginia Regiment on September 30, 1775. He was captured at Fort Washington on November 16, 1776 and was later paroled.

He was promoted to major in the 7th Virginia Regiment on March 22, 1777 and to lieutenant colonel of the 22nd Virginia on February 21, 1778. He was appointed lieutenant colonel commandant of the 14th Virginia on April 6, 1778 and was promoted to colonel retroactive to March 20, 1778. He was wounded in action at the Battle of Monmouth on June 28 of the same year.

The 14th Virginia was redesignated the 10th Virginia on September 14, 1778. Davies was reassigned to the 1st Virginia on February 12, 1781.  He served until the close of the war in 1783.

References

Biographical sketch
Service record from Francis B. Heitman's Historical Register of Officers of the Continental Army.

Continental Army officers from Virginia